Thomas Stålhandske (born 2 October 1961) is an Argentine former professional tennis player.

Born in Buenos Aires, Stålhandske turned professional in 1980 and made regular appearances on the ATP Challenger Tour as well as in occasional Grand Prix tournaments. He had a best singles world ranking of 255 and made two Challenger semi-finals. At Grand Prix level he made the second round at Itaparica in 1983 and Kitzbuhel in 1984.

References

External links
 
 

1961 births
Living people
Argentine male tennis players
Tennis players from Buenos Aires
20th-century Argentine people